Sumithra Arachchige Don Bandula Chandrasiri Gunawardane  (born 15 March 1953) is a Sri Lankan politician, teacher and film producer who is a member of the Parliament of Sri Lanka for Colombo District, and a former government minister.

Early life
He was born in Mabula village, in Avisasalwella Electorate, Colombo District, Sri Lanka. His primary education was at Roman Catholic School in Mabula and for secondary education he entered to Rajasinghe Central College. He entered Lumbini College for his Advanced Level studies and entered to University of Sri Jayewardenepura after passing A/Ls in commerce stream.

Career 
He was a tutor in the city which he started as a hobby while he was still in university. He successfully contested the 1989 parliamentary election as a candidate for the Mahajana Eksath Peramuna party, and entered parliament. He was defeated in the subsequent 1994 parliamentary election.

Gunawardena was the producer of the film, Suddilage Kathaawa, which won Sarasaviya Awards.

Personal life
He is married and has four children: a son, Sahan, and three daughters. In 2021, his daughter Randula was appointed Third Secretary to the Sri Lankan Permanent Mission to the United Nations in New York.

See also
 Cabinet of Sri Lanka

Notes

References

External links
 "කන්‍යාවි" අසභ්‍යයි? ගුවන්විදුලියේ තහනම්

Sinhalese politicians
Living people
1953 births
Lumbini College alumni
Members of the 9th Parliament of Sri Lanka
Members of the 11th Parliament of Sri Lanka
Members of the 12th Parliament of Sri Lanka
Members of the 13th Parliament of Sri Lanka
Members of the 14th Parliament of Sri Lanka
Members of the 15th Parliament of Sri Lanka
Members of the 16th Parliament of Sri Lanka
Education ministers of Sri Lanka
Mahajana Eksath Peramuna politicians
United National Party politicians
United People's Freedom Alliance politicians